Maison Rouge (French, 'Red House') may refer to:

 Maison-Rouge, a commune in France
 La Maison Rouge, an art gallery in Paris, France
 Maison Rouge, the home of pirate Jean Lafitte in Galveston, Texas, U.S.

See also
 
 Red House (disambiguation)
 Maison (disambiguation)
 Rouge (disambiguation)